Llandudno Amateurs F.C. are a Welsh football club from Llandudno, Conwy County Borough, North Wales. They play at The Oval and are currently members of the North Wales Coast East Football League Division One.

History
Formed in 2017, the club having gained two back-to-back promotions as champions of the Vale of Clwyd and Conwy Football League Premier and First divisions. They have also been noted for their 5–2 Welsh Cup win in 2018 over Greenfield.

Honours

 Vale of Clwyd and Conwy Football League Premier Division - Champions: 2018–19.
 Vale of Clwyd and Conwy Football League First Division  - Champions: 2017–18
 President's Cup - Runners-Up: 2017–18

See also
 Llandudno Amateurs – a team of the same name which existed in the Edwardian era.

References

External links
Official club Facebook

Football clubs in Wales
Sport in Conwy County Borough
Llandudno
2017 establishments in Wales
Association football clubs established in 2017
Welsh Alliance League clubs
North Wales Coast Football League clubs
Vale of Clwyd and Conwy Football League clubs